The 14th Carabinieri Battalion "Calabria" is a Carabinieri riot control unit headquartered in Vibo Valentia, established on 1 March 2017, in order to increase the Carabinieri presence in Calabria. The unit is tasked with riot control and search activities.

The unit was established in order to strengthen the Carabinieri role in the territorial control and riot control tasks in Calabria, mainly against 'Ndrangheta. The unit, according to the official statements made by Interior Minister Marco Minniti, is to be also involved in searches for fugitives, in coordination with the Carabinieri Squadron “Cacciatori di Calabria”, as well as sensitive targets surveillance and territorial support.

The Battalion is based in the Caserma "Luigi Razza" in Vibo Valentia, the same of the Squadron “Cacciatori di Calabria”.

According to Commandant-general Del Sette, the Battalion has one Company specialized in riot control and one Company specialized in providing support to the Carabinieri territorial organization.

Lieutenant Colonel Verticchio, commander of the Battalion, assumed office on 9 March 2017.

On 14 July 2017, the War Flag was granted to the 14th Carabinieri Battalion "Calabria" by President of the Republic Sergio Mattarella.

List of Commanders 
 Ten. Col. Milko Verticchio: 1 March 2017 - 10 September 2020
 Ten. Col. Samuele Sighinolfi: 11 September 2020 - incumbent

Related voices 
 Carabinieri
 Carabinieri Mobile Units Division
 1st Carabinieri Mobile Brigade
 Riot control
 'Ndrangheta

References

Units and formations of the Carabinieri
C
Gendarmerie battalions